John III Doukas Vatatzes, Latinized as Ducas Vatatzes (Iōannēs Doukas Vatatzēs, c. 1192 – 3 November 1254), was Emperor of Nicaea from 1221 to 1254. He was succeeded by his son, known as Theodore II Laskaris.

Life

John Doukas Vatatzes, born in about 1192 in Didymoteicho, was probably the son of the general Basil Vatatzes, who was killed in battle in 1194, and his wife, a cousin of the Emperors Isaac II Angelos and Alexios III Angelos. John Doukas Vatatzes had two older brothers. The eldest was Isaac Doukas Vatatzes (1188-1261), while his younger brother died young. Through his marriage to Eudokia Angelina he fathered Theodora Doukaina Vatatzaina, who later married Michael VIII Palaiologos. The middle brother's name is unknown, but his daughter married the protovestiarios Alexios Raoul.

A successful soldier from a military family, John was chosen in about 1216 by Emperor Theodore I Laskaris as the second husband for his daughter Irene Laskarina and as heir to the throne, following the death of her first husband, Andronikos Palaiologos. This arrangement excluded members of the Laskarid family from the succession, and when John III became emperor in December 1221, following Theodore I's death in November, he had to suppress opposition to his rule. The struggle ended with the Battle of Poimanenon in 1224, in which his opponents were defeated in spite of support from the Latin Empire of Constantinople. John III's victory led to territorial concessions by the Latin Empire in 1225, followed by John's incursion into Europe, where he seized Adrianople.

John III's possession of Adrianople was terminated by Theodore Komnenos Doukas of Epirus and Thessalonica, who drove the Nicaean garrison out of Adrianople and annexed much of Thrace in 1227. The elimination of Theodore by Ivan Asen II of Bulgaria in 1230 put an end to the danger posed by Thessalonica, and John III made an alliance with Bulgaria against the Latin Empire.

In 1235 this alliance resulted in the restoration of the Bulgarian patriarchate and the marriage between Elena of Bulgaria and Theodore II, respectively Ivan Asen II's daughter and John III's son. In that same year, the Bulgarians and Nicaeans campaigned against the Latin Empire, and in 1236 they attempted a siege of Constantinople. Subsequently, Ivan Asen II adopted an ambivalent policy, effectively becoming neutral, and leaving John III to his own devices.

John III Vatatzes was greatly interested in the collection and copying of manuscripts, and William of Rubruck reports that he owned a copy of the missing books from Ovid's Fasti. Rubruck was critical of the Hellenic traditions he encountered in the Empire of Nicaea, specifically the feast day for Saint Felicity favored by John Vatatzes, which Friedrich Risch suggests would have been the Felicitanalia, practiced by Sulla to venerate Felicitas in the 1st century with an emphasis on inverting social norms, extolling truth and beauty, reciting profane and satirical verse and wearing ornamented "cenatoria", or dinner robes during the day.

In spite of some reverses against the Latin Empire in 1240, John III was able to take advantage of Ivan Asen II's death in 1241 to impose his own suzerainty over Thessalonica (in 1242), and later to annex this city, as well as much of Bulgarian Thrace in 1246. Immediately afterwards, John III was able to establish an effective stranglehold on Constantinople in 1247. In the last years of his reign Nicaean authority extended far to the west, where John III attempted to contain the expansion of Epirus. Michael's allies Golem of Kruja and Theodore Petraliphas defected to John III in 1252.
John III died in Nymphaion in 1254, and was buried in the monastery of Sosandra, which he had founded, in the region of Magnesia.

Family

John III Doukas Vatatzes married first Irene Lascarina, the daughter of his predecessor Theodore I Laskaris in 1212. They had one son, the future Theodore II Doukas Laskaris. Irene fell from a horse and was so badly injured that she was unable to have any more children.

Irene retired to a convent, taking the monastic name Eugenia, and died there in summer of 1240. John III married as his second wife Constance II of Hohenstaufen, an illegitimate daughter of Emperor Frederick II by his mistress Bianca Lancia. They had no children.

Legacy

John III Doukas Vatatzes was a successful ruler who laid the groundwork for Nicaea's recovery of Constantinople. He was successful in maintaining generally peaceful relations with his most powerful neighbors, Bulgaria and the Sultanate of Rum, and his network of diplomatic relations extended to the Holy Roman Empire and the Papacy, while his armed forces included Frankish, Cumans, Uzes, Pechenegs mercenaries. 

John III effected Nicaean expansion into Europe, where by the end of his reign he had annexed his former rival Thessalonica and had expanded at the expense of Bulgaria and Epirus. He also expanded Nicaean control over much of the Aegean and annexed the important island of Rhodes, while he supported initiatives to free Crete from Venetian occupation aiming toward its re-unification with the Byzantine empire of Nicaea.

Moreover, John III is credited with carefully developing the internal prosperity and economy of his realm, encouraging justice and charity. In spite of his epilepsy, John III had provided active leadership in both peace and war, claimed to be the true inheritor of the Roman Empire, and was known for bountiful harvest festivals which reportedly drew on traditions from the Felicitas feast days described in the missing 11th book of Ovid's Book of Days.

A half-century after his death, John III was canonized as a saint, under the name John the Merciful, and is commemorated annually on November 4. George Akropolites mentions that the people saw to the construction of a temple in his honour in Nymphaeum, and that his cult as a saint quickly spread to the people of western Asia Minor. On the same day, since 2010, the Vatatzeia festival is organized at Didymoteicho by the local metropolitan bishop. Alice Gardiner remarked on the persistence of John's cult among the Ionian Greeks as late as the early 20th century, and on the contrast she witnessed where "the clergy and people of Magnesia and the neighbourhood revere his memory every fourth of November. But those who ramble and play about his ruined palace seldom connect it even with his name."

His feast day is formally an Eastern Orthodox holiday, although it is not commemorated with any special liturgy; there are two known historical akolouthiai for him, including an 1874 copy of an older Magnesian menaion for the month of November, which shows that in the 15th and 16th century, he was venerated as "the holy glorious equal of the Apostles and emperor John Vatatzes, the new almsgiver in Magnesia." The relevant hymns are preserved in only one known manuscript in the library of the Leimonos monastery on Lesbos, Greece, and include references to the feast day for the almsgiver John Vatatzes. John III Vatatzes' feast day has largely fallen out of favor other than in the church dedicated to him in his birth city of Didymoteicho.

The generations after John Vatatzes looked back upon him as "the Father of the Greeks."

Legend of the Reposed King

According to the legend, his incorrupt relics were transferred to Constantinople, which had been liberated from the Franks, where the legend of the reposed King became associated with him. At the time of the fall of Constantinople to the Ottoman Turks, his relics were hidden in a catacomb, and were guarded by a family of Crypto-Christians, which kept them secret from generation to generation. The legend states that since that time, he has been awaiting the liberation of Constantinople.

See also

List of Byzantine emperors

Notes

References

Sources

 
 
 Jonathan Harris, Byzantium and the Crusades, London: Bloomsbury, 2nd ed., 2014. 
 John S. Langdon. Byzantium’s Last Imperial Offensive in Asia Minor: The Documentary Evidence for and Hagiographical Lore About John III Ducas Vatatzes' Crusade Against the Turks, 1222 or 1225 to 1231. New Rochelle, N.Y.: A.D. Caratzas, 1992.
 
 George Ostrogorsky. History of the Byzantine State. New Brunswick, N.J: Rutgers University Press, 1969.

External links
 

1192 births
1254 deaths
13th-century Byzantine emperors
13th-century Greek people
13th-century Christian saints
Byzantine saints of the Eastern Orthodox Church
John 03
John 03
Eastern Orthodox monarchs
Saints from Anatolia
People from Didymoteicho
John 03
People with epilepsy
Royalty and nobility with disabilities